The Blue Star Hotel is a Czechoslovak comedy film directed by Martin Frič. It is a remake of a Karel Lamač's German film The Love Hotel.

Cast
 Nataša Gollová as Zuzana Nedbalová
 Oldřich Nový as Vladimír Rychta Rohan
 Adina Mandlová as Milada Landová
 Karel Černý as Milada's father
 Ladislav Pešek as Cook Zdeněk Junek
 Jan Pivec as Musician Jirka Tůma
 Antonín Novotný as Composer František Sojka
 Ferenc Futurista as Drunkard
 Jára Kohout as Security
 Karel Dostal as Hotel General Manager
 Čeněk Šlégl as Hotel Manager
 František Roland as Notary
 Vojtech Novák as Psychiatrist
 Marie Nademlejnská as Miss Fafejtová, owner of Hotel Merkur
 Ella Nollová as Thief in Hotel Modrá Hvězda

References

External links
 

1941 films
1941 comedy films
Czech black-and-white films
Czechoslovak black-and-white films
Films directed by Martin Frič
1940s Czech-language films
Czechoslovak comedy films
1940s Czech films